In geometry, the square cupola, sometimes called lesser dome, is one of the Johnson solids. It can be obtained as a slice of the rhombicuboctahedron.  As in all cupolae, the base polygon has twice as many edges and vertices as the top; in this case the base polygon is an octagon.

Formulae
The following formulae for the circumradius, surface area, volume, and height can be used if all faces are regular, with edge length a:

Related polyhedra and honeycombs

Other convex cupolae

Dual polyhedron 
The dual of the square cupola has 8 triangular and 4 kite faces:

Crossed square cupola 

The crossed square cupola is one of the nonconvex Johnson solid isomorphs, being topologically identical to the convex square cupola. It can be obtained as a slice of the nonconvex great rhombicuboctahedron or quasirhombicuboctahedron, analogously to how the square cupola may be obtained as a slice of the rhombicuboctahedron. As in all cupolae, the base polygon has twice as many edges and vertices as the top; in this case the base polygon is an octagram.

It may be seen as a cupola with a retrograde square base, so that the squares and triangles connect across the bases in the opposite way to the square cupola, hence intersecting each other.

Honeycombs 
The square cupola is a component of several nonuniform space-filling lattices:
 with tetrahedra;
 with cubes and cuboctahedra; and
 with tetrahedra, square pyramids and various combinations of cubes, elongated square pyramids and elongated square bipyramids.

References

External links
 

Prismatoid polyhedra
Johnson solids